is a city located in the northern part of Okinawa Island, Okinawa Prefecture, Japan. As of December 2012, the city has an estimated population of 61,659 and a population density of 288 persons per km2. Its total area is 210.30 km2.

History
Nago Castle was built in the 14th century and served as the home of the Aji of Nago Magiri. Nago had always been one of the major settlements in Northern Okinawa, and a major port along with Unten. Nago Magiri became Nago town in 1907. Nago was upgraded to city status on August 1, 1970 with the merger of nine smaller towns and villages.

Nago hosted Expo '75 in a park which utilized a monorail train to move tourists to each exhibit. Its most popular exhibit was the Japanese Floating City; similar to an oil rig, the city floated on large pontoons which allowed it to be moved. If the city was threatened with a typhoon, it would move close to shore, fill the pontoons with sea water and sit on the ocean floor for more stability. The city was self sufficient, and used the ocean floor for cultivating seaweed and other edible plants. Nago also hosted the 26th G8 summit in 2000.

Nago established itself as a tax haven for financial companies in 2002, following the example of Dublin, Ireland. The Nago Multimedia Building was established as the core of this zone, with various subsidies for foreign financial firms to establish offices there.

Nago is the site of Camp Schwab, a United States Marine Corps base established in 1956. It has gained national attention in Japan due to the controversy surrounding the relocation of Marine Corps Air Station Futenma in Ginowan, as there have been proposals at various times to relocate the base to a new site adjacent to or within Camp Schwab, most recently in April 2013. The January 19, 2014 mayoral election in Nago became a de facto referendum on the April 2013 relocation plan, with incumbent mayor Susumu Inamine opposing the plan and his challenger, former Vice Mayor Bunshin Suematsu, supporting the plan.

Climate
Nago has a humid subtropical climate (Köppen climate classification Cfa) with very warm summers and mild winters. Precipitation is abundant throughout the year; the wettest month is August and the driest month is December.

Tourism 
Nago is a tourist town. The many beaches draw Okinawans, mainland Japanese, Americans and other tourists to the northern part of the island. The main beach, known as Nago beach, is located on highway 58 in 21st Century Park. The facilities have showers, washrooms, and vending machines, and sites can be rented for picnics or barbecues. There is a lifeguard on duty and a net in the water to prevent harmful sea creatures from entering the swimming area.

A popular tourist destination is the Pineapple Park which is located on route 84. Right beside the Pineapple Park is Okinawa Fruits land. Pineapple Park is an interactive museum where visitors can see how pineapple is grown, and how pineapple wine is made. There is also a collection of thousands of seashells.

Okinawa Fruits Land is a conservatory with many plants, birds and fruits. A map is provided and tourists can wander through the park as they wish. There are many types of tropical birds.

The corals and seagrass beds of the east coast of Nago are home to the last remaining population of dugong in Japan.

Nago also hosts the international bicycle race known as the Tour de Okinawa, which is usually held in November.

Since 1959, Nago has hosted the Nago 1/2 marathon race in February.

Because of Nago's sub tropical environment, cherry blossoms bloom early in the year. Nago is always one of the first cities to host the cherry blossom festival every year in January.

Economy
Orion Breweries has its factory in Nago. The city is also noted for the production of cement, rice, sugarcane, and pineapples.

Education
Founded as a private university, the now public Meio University is located in Nago.

References

External links

Nago City official website 

Cities in Okinawa Prefecture